The 1894 Drexel Dragons football team represented the Drexel Institute of Technology (renamed Drexel University in 1970) as an independent during the 1894 college football season.  The team did not have a head coach.

In either the team's first exhibition game against Penn freshman, or the regular season game against Hamilton School (there are conflicting reports), Knight, playing at fullback, suffered a fractured skull which killed him.  This is one of the earliest recorded deaths of an American football player due to injuries sustained during a game.

Schedule

Roster

References

Drexel
Drexel Dragons football seasons
Drexel Dragons football